The 2010 PGA Tour was the 43rd season since the Tour became independent from the PGA of America. The season ran from January 7 to November 14 and consisted of 46 official money events. This included four major championships and three World Golf Championships, which are also sanctioned by the European Tour.

Schedule
The following table lists official events during the 2010 season.

Unofficial events
The following events were sanctioned by the PGA Tour, but did not carry FedEx Cup points or official money, nor were wins official.

Location of tournaments

Money leaders
The money list was based on prize money won during the season, calculated in U.S. dollars.

Awards

Notes

References

External links
2010 PGA Tour at ESPN

PGA Tour seasons
PGA Tour